Rich Mountain is a historic home and farm complex located at Frederick, Frederick County, Maryland, United States. It is on the remaining  tract from the original farm. The complex consists of a stone dwelling dating from 1810 to 1820 with a one-story kitchen wing; a 19th-century frame Pennsylvania barn; and a hog barn, wagon shed / corn crib, equipment shed, and chicken coop.  The house combines Federal style elements with regional vernacular features.

Rich Mountain was listed on the National Register of Historic Places in 2005.

References

External links
, including undated photo, at Maryland Historical Trust

Houses in Frederick County, Maryland
Houses on the National Register of Historic Places in Maryland
Houses completed in 1820
Federal architecture in Maryland
National Register of Historic Places in Frederick County, Maryland